Micmacs of Gesgapegiag are a Mi'gmaq First Nation in Quebec, Canada. They are based at Maria, Quebec on the Gaspé Peninsula and they have one Indian reserve, Gesgapegiag. In 2016 the band has a registered population of 1,501 members. The First Nation is part of the Mi'gmawei Mawiomi Secretariat.

Demographics 
The members of the First Nation of Gesgapegiag are Mi'gmaq. In December 2016 the band had a total registered population of 1,501 members, 794 of whom lived off reserve.

Geography 
Micmacs of Gesgapegiag are based at Maria, Quebec on the Gaspé Peninsula. They own one Indian reserve, Gesgapegiag, located 56 km east of Restigouche. The reserve has an area of 221 hectares.

Language 
Mi'gmaq speak Mi'gmaq, an Eastern Algonquian language. According to Statistics Canada's 2011 census, 63.8% of the population speak an Aboriginal language. 32.6% has an Aboriginal language as the first language learned and 46.8% speak an Aboriginal language at home. 45.4% of the population speak English and French and 53.9% speak only English.

Governance 

Micmacs of Gesgapegiag are governed by a band council elected according to the First Nations Elections Act. For the 2019-2023 tenure, this council is composed of the chief, John Martin, and eight councillors.

See also 
Gesgapegiag
Mi'gmaq

References

External links 
First Nation Detail by Indigenous and Northern Affairs Canada

Gaspé Peninsula
First Nations governments in Quebec